Euchromius locustus is a species of moth in the family Crambidae. It is found in Tanzania, Zaire and Zambia.

The length of the forewings is 14–17 mm. The groundcolour of the forewings is creamy white, densely suffused with ochreous to dark brown scales. The hindwings are grey-brown with a darkly bordered termen. Adults have been recorded in August, September, October and December.

References

Moths described in 1988
Crambinae
Moths of Africa